Robert Henry Rimmer (March 14, 1917 – August 1, 2001) was an American writer who authored several books, most notably The Harrad Experiment, which was made into a film in 1973.

The recurring theme in almost all of Rimmer's writing was a criticism of the assumption of monogamy as a societal norm. They explore various ways of organizing life, through laws or other means, to facilitate non-monogamous relationships.

Biography
Robert Henry Rimmer was born in Boston, Massachusetts, on March 14, 1917, to Francis "Frank" Henry Rimmer, a printing company owner, and Blanche Rosealma, née Rochefort, Rimmer in Boston, Massachusetts. A. Frank Rimmer, determined to be successful in business, had a series of sales positions including selling vacuum cleaners, then typewriters, door to door, before securing a loan to open his own printing firm in 1916. With the support of business partner, George Duffy, Frank Rimmer formed the Relief Printing Corporation soon after Robert's birth, "relief" meaning raised print on business cards and stationery. Robert Rimmer stated, "Little did I know as a growing fetus in Blanche's womb that twenty-nine years later Relief Printing Corporation would own me, and FH, as I began to call him ("Dad" seemed inappropriate when I was finally in business with him), would be subtly controlling my life."

His relationship with his father, especially, and his mother are reflected in some of his works, such as the novel The Rebellion of Yale Marrat. Rimmer stated, "I transformed portions of my realities into fiction. Pat Marrat, for example, is a fleshier, cigar-smoking version of FH. The conflict between Matt Godwin and his father in The Immoral Reverend has many similarities." Rimmer has stated that his greatest influences came from reading books, since this was the only real available entertainment in his developmental years, especially reading of his heroes such as Benjamin Franklin and the "Bound to Rise" heroes of Horatio Alger, as well as Hans Christian Andersen, Mark Twain, and the unexpurgated Arabian Nights. He graduated from Bates College with a multi-disciplinary degree in English, Psychology and Philosophy and later obtained an MBA from Harvard. He served in World War II. When his enlistment was up, he returned to the U.S. and took a position in the family printing business. 25 years passed before he wrote his first novel.

Rimmer died in Quincy, Massachusetts, on August 1, 2001.

Bibliography

Film adaptations
Rimmer's novel The Harrad Experiment was made into a film in 1973, and That Girl from Boston was adapted in 1975.

References

External links

"Yarns Without Threads", a review of Robert Rimmer's novels The Harrad Experiment, Proposition 31 and The Premar Experiments
 (1973)
 (1975)

1917 births
2001 deaths
Bates College alumni
20th-century American novelists
American male novelists
Harvard Business School alumni
American military personnel of World War II
20th-century American male writers